Mary Katherine Dimke (born 1977) is an American lawyer who serves as a United States district judge for the United States District Court for the Eastern District of Washington. She previously served as a United States magistrate judge of the same court from 2016 to 2021.

Early life and education 

Dimke was born in 1977 in Clarkston, Washington. She graduated from Clarkston High School. Dimke received her Bachelor of Arts, magna cum laude, from Pepperdine University in 1999 and her Juris Doctor from Vanderbilt University Law School in 2002 as a member of the Order of the Coif.

Career 

Dimke began her legal career as a law clerk for Judge Alan Bond Johnson of the United States District Court for the District of Wyoming from 2002 to 2003. She then clerked for Judge Richard C. Tallman of the United States Court of Appeals for the Ninth Circuit from 2003 to 2004. She joined the United States Department of Justice through its Honors Program in 2004 where she served as an attorney in the Fraud Section of the Criminal Division until 2007. She served as an Assistant United States Attorney for the Western District of Washington from 2008 to 2012 and for the Eastern District of Washington from 2012 to 2016.

Federal judicial service 

In November 2015, she was named as a United States magistrate judge for the United States District Court for the Eastern District of Washington to succeed Judge James Hutton. She was sworn in on January 14, 2016, by Judge Richard C. Tallman. 

On August 5, 2021, President Joe Biden nominated Dimke to serve as a United States district judge of the United States District Court for the Eastern District of Washington. Dimke was nominated to the seat held by Judge Rosanna M. Peterson, who assumed senior status on October 1, 2021. On October 20, 2021, a hearing on her nomination was held before the Senate Judiciary Committee. On December 2, 2021, her nomination was reported out of committee by a 16–6 vote. On December 18, 2021, the United States Senate invoked cloture on her nomination by a 47–23 vote. That same day, her nomination was confirmed by a 47–23 vote. Dimke received her commission on December 21, 2021. She was sworn into office by Chief Judge Stanley Bastian later that day.

Personal life 

Dimke's father, John Dimke, was a cattle rancher and her mother, Jan Dimke, was the secretary treasurer of Bennett Lumber Products.

References

External links 

1977 births
Living people
20th-century American women lawyers
20th-century American lawyers
21st-century American judges
21st-century American women judges
Assistant United States Attorneys
Judges of the United States District Court for the Eastern District of Washington
People from Clarkston, Washington
Pepperdine University alumni
United States Department of Justice lawyers
United States district court judges appointed by Joe Biden
United States magistrate judges
Vanderbilt University Law School alumni